Le Républicain Lorrain (founded in 1919) is a daily regional French newspaper based in Metz. As of 2012, its daily circulation was 123,357. In 2020, its circulation amounted to 87,508 copies.

The newspaper has its primary market in the région of Lorraine.

It belongs to the French bank Crédit Mutuel, who also owns the newspapers L'Alsace and Le Pays.

See also
 List of newspapers in France

References

External links
 Le Républicain Lorrain website 

Daily newspapers published in France
Mass media in Metz, France